The Copa Paz del Chaco (Spanish for Chaco Armistice Cup) is a football international friendly match between the Paraguayan and Bolivia national football teams, played since 1957.

History
The trophy was instituted jointly by the Paraguayan Football Association and the Bolivian Football Federation. Its name is a tribute to the armistice that the two countries signed in 1935, after the bloody war that claimed since 1932. The dispute has been irregular, the rules state that they must do two regular meetings in each capital.

The trophy was at stake ten times, with Paraguay winning 7 times and Bolivia 3 times.

The 2003 edition was the only one that took place with players under 23 years.

The last game played was on June 20, 2008, at the Ramón Tahuichi Aguilera Stadium in the city of Santa Cruz de la Sierra, Bolivia, the game ended tied.

Statistical summary 

 PG=Played games; W=Won games; T=Tied games; L=Lost games; GF=Goals for; GA=Goals against; DIF=Goals differences

References

Recurring sporting events established in 1957
Bolivia national football team
Paraguay national football team
International association football competitions hosted by Bolivia
International association football competitions hosted by Paraguay